The British Columbia Junior Tier 1 Lacrosse League, or BCJT1LL is a Junior B box lacrosse league based in the Lower Mainland of British Columbia, Canada, sanctioned by the British Columbia Lacrosse Association. The league champion competes for the British Columbia Junior B Provincial Championship. Teams have competed for the Founders Cup, a national tournament which determines the Canadian Junior B lacrosse champion.

History
The league was known as the BC Intermediate A League until the end of 2017.  At the beginning of the 2018 season, 17 & 18 year old lacrosse was merged with Junior B, expanding the bracket to the age brackets used by the rest of the Canadian Lacrosse Association.

Teams

Former teams 

 Abbotsford Timberwolves (2003–04)
 Burnaby Cablevision (1986)
 Delta Spuddiggers (1994; never played a game)
 Edmonton Goldbar (1986)
 Esquimalt Legion
 Juan de Fuca Whalers (1988)
 Langley Knights
 Nanaimo Timbermen
North Shore Eagles
 North Shore Indians
Port Moody Thunder (1988-2017)
Richmond Roadrunners (2009–16)
Saanich Tigers (1990)
 Squamish Nation (1993)
Surrey Rebels (1989-2014)
 Vancouver-Killarney (1986–89)

Champions

See also
Thompson Okanagan Junior Lacrosse League
Pacific Northwest Junior Lacrosse League
West Coast Junior Lacrosse League

References

External links
WCJLL website
BCLA website

Sport in Vancouver
5
Youth sport in Canada